{
  "type": "ExternalData",
  "service": "geoline",
  "ids": "Q2859238",
  "properties": {
    "title": "Delaware Aqueduct, New York",
    "description": "Delaware Aqueduct in New York",
    "stroke": "#0000ff",
    "stroke-width": 8
  }
}

The Delaware Aqueduct is an aqueduct in the New York City water supply system. It takes water from the Rondout, Cannonsville, Neversink, and Pepacton reservoirs on the west bank of the Hudson River through the Chelsea Pump Station, then into the West Branch, Kensico, and Hillview reservoirs on the east bank, ending at Hillview in Yonkers, New York.

Reservoirs and watersheds

(The latter three reservoirs are within the Delaware River watershed. Rondout is considered by the New York City Department of Environmental Protection (NYCDEP) to be part of the Delaware system despite being firmly within the Hudson River watershed.)

All this water is fed from the Rondout to West Branch Reservoir in Putnam County (part of the Croton River watershed, which includes the flow of the upstream Boyds Corner Reservoir), then to the Kensico, and Hillview reservoirs in southern Westchester County, before continuing on to distribution within New York City.

Leak problems 
The city took many years to analyze the leak problem and devise a solution. In 2010 it announced a plan for a major repair project.

Repairs 
The NYCDEP is building a  Rondout-West Branch Bypass Tunnel beneath the Hudson River, which will allow it to bypass the leak. Construction began in November 2013. "The number's going to be $1.5 billion to do the entire program to make the fix," said Paul Rush, Deputy Commissioner of the NYCDEP. "About two-thirds of it, $1 billion, will actually go into constructing a bypass tunnel around the location with the most significant leakage in Roseton, and to do additional concrete grouting in the Wawarsing section."

The new bypass tunnel is the largest construction project in NYCDEP's history. Construction of the tunnel,  under the Hudson, was completed in 2019. To complete the repairs the aqueduct will be shut down temporarily in October 2022. NYCDEP estimates completion of the repair project in 2023.

See also
 Catskill Aqueduct
 Croton Aqueduct
 Delaware River Basin Commission

References

Further reading

External links
 "Giant Tube To Supply Water For Ten Millions", Popular Mechanics, August 1937—detailed article with drawings and maps on proposed Delaware Aqueduct

Water infrastructure of New York City
Landmarks in New York (state)
Aqueducts in New York (state)
Transportation buildings and structures in Putnam County, New York
Transportation buildings and structures in Ulster County, New York
Transportation buildings and structures in Westchester County, New York
Interbasin transfer